Dainik Statesman is a Bengali daily newspaper run by The Statesman group with its central office being The Statesman House at Chowringhee. Dainik Statesman started circulation from 28 June 2004.

The newspaper became more popular after the Singur and Nandigram clashes since 2006 when The Statesman group and more specifically the Bengali version, Dainik Statesman presented the views of those opposed to land-acquisition whereas the ABP group was more interested in presenting the views of those who were for land being acquired forcibly. Special issues of this paper are - Khetkhamar, Gallery, Biggan o Projukti, Sorir o Sastho, Bitorko , Berano, Bongodarpan, Anno Bhabna Porshi desh, Boier Ondore Biswobarta, Khushir Uran, Silpo o Banijjo. Every Saturday entertainment related special issue - Binodon, Sunday special - Bichitra are also very popular to daily readers.

References

External Links:

Dainik Statesman official website : http://dainikstatesmannews.com

Dainik Statesman Epaper: http://epaper.thestatesman.com/t/9256/?s=Dainik-Statesman

Newspapers published in Kolkata
Bengali-language newspapers published in India
Culture of Kolkata
Publications established in 2004
2004 establishments in West Bengal